The NCAA Division III Men's Soccer Championship is an annual single-elimination tournament to determine the national champion of National Collegiate Athletic Association (NCAA) Division III collegiate men's soccer in the United States.

Messiah is the most successful team, with 11 titles. 

The Chicago Maroons are the reigning champions, winning their first championship in 2022.

History
It has been held each year since 1974, except 2020, when the Division III championship was established for universities that do not award athletics scholarships. The 2020 tournament was cancelled due to the Covid-19 pandemic. Division III teams had previously competed as part of the NCAA College Division Men's Soccer Championship (now Division II). A total of 64 teams participate, making it the largest of the NCAA's men's soccer tournaments.

Traditionally, the tournament is held in November and December at the end of the regular season. The tournament finals were initially held on the campus of one of the teams participating in the semifinals. Since 2004, however, they have been held at the same pre-determined neutral site as the NCAA Division III Women's Soccer Championship (added in 1986).

Selection format
Of the three NCAA divisions, Division III has the most complicated selection process. In 2012, the tournament was a 62-team, single-elimination tournament. Teams are divided into three pools. Pool A consists of the 36 conference champions, who all receive automatic bids to the tournament. Pool B consists of all teams which are not in conferences or which are in conferences that do not meet the requirements to be awarded an automatic bid. Four teams are selected from Pool B. Pool C consists of all the other teams, plus those Pool B teams not already selected. The remaining teams in the field are selected from Pool C. Two teams received first round byes, and the rest of the bracket was filled by geographical proximity. The early rounds of the championship were played at campus sites with the higher seeded team hosting the match. The semifinals and finals are played at a predetermined campus site. The 2012 Division III final rounds were held at Blossom Soccer Complex in San Antonio.

Results

Champions

 Schools highlight in yellow have reclassified athletics from NCAA Division III.

See also
 NCAA Men's Soccer Championships (Division I, Division II)
 NCAA Women's Soccer Championships (Division I, Division II, Division III)
 NAIA national men's soccer championship
 Intercollegiate Soccer Football Association

References

External links
Div. III men's soccer championship brackets

 
Recurring sporting events established in 1974